Alphitonia ponderosa is a species of flowering tree in the family Rhamnaceae, that is endemic to the Hawaiian Islands.  It is locally known as kauila, as is the related Colubrina oppositifolia.

Description

Leaves
The leaves are shiny, hairless, and green on the top, but are a dull light green with rust-colored veins on the bottom.

Flowers
Flowers of A. ponderosa are polygamous and form cymes at the bases of leaves.

Fruit
The fruit of A. ponderosa is a  diameter drupe, which contain two to three seeds.  The seeds are shiny, oblong, and have a red covering.

Habitat
It grows as a shrub on exposed ridges.

Uses
The reddish-brown wood of A. ponderosa is highly prized for its beauty, strength, and density.  It was used as a replacement for metal by the Native Hawaiians, who made laau melomelo (fishing lures),  (daggers),  (short spears),  (long spears), ōō (digging sticks),  (round ,  ie kūkū (square  beaters),  (shark tooth clubs), and kii (tiki carvings) with it.

Conservation
Alphitonia ponderosa is considered a vulnerable species by the IUCN because of its fragmented distribution and declining population.  Major threats include rats, pigs, deer, competition with introduced species of plants, and wildfire.

See also
 Colubrina oppositifolia
 Kauila

References

ponderosa
Endemic flora of Hawaii
Trees of Hawaii
Biota of Kauai
Taxonomy articles created by Polbot